Lam Beshkest-e Pain (also Romanized as Lām Beshkest-e Pā’īn) is a village in Eshkevar-e Sofla Rural District, Rahimabad District, Rudsar County, Gilan Province, Iran. At the 2006 census, its population was 95, in 28 families.

References 

Populated places in Rudsar County